Yan Shau Wai, sometimes transliterated as Yan Sau Wai, is a walled village in the San Tin area of Yuen Long District, Hong Kong.

Administration
Yan Sau Wai is a recognized village under the New Territories Small House Policy.

See also
 Walled villages of Hong Kong

References

External links
 Delineation of area of existing village Yan Sau Wai (San Tin) for election of resident representative (2019 to 2022)
 Antiquities Advisory Board. Historic Building Appraisal. Entrance Gate, Enclosing Walls and Shrine, Yan Shau Wai, San Tin Pictures

Walled villages of Hong Kong
Villages in Yuen Long District, Hong Kong
San Tin